The Shipping Corporation of India (SCI) is a government corporation  that operates and manages vessels servicing both national and international lines. It is under the ownership of the Ministry of Shipping, Government of India, with its headquarters in Mumbai.

History

SCI was established on 2 October 1961 by the amalgamation of Eastern Shipping Corporation and Western Shipping Corporation. Two more shipping companies, Jayanti Shipping Company and Mogul Lines Limited, were merged with SCI in 1973 and 1986 respectively.

SCI started out with 19 vessels. It gradually metamorphosed into a conglomerate having 80 ships of 59 lakh (5.9 million) tonnes deadweight (DWT) with interests in different segments of the shipping trade.

Inland & Coastal Shipping Ltd. (ICSL) , SCI’s wholly owned subsidiary was incorporated in 2016 after Maritime India summit for undertaking/providing transport services through Inland waterways, coastal shipping and end to end logistics. Inland waterways transport is not only an environment friendly and fuel-efficient mode of transport, but would also help reduce overall logistics costs, providing affordable transport solutions connecting country’s vast hinterland.

On 21 November 2019, the Government of India approved the privatisation of SCI. In 2022, the privatisation was delayed by the Russo-Ukraine war.

Services
 Cruise liner and Passenger services
 Bulk carrier and tanker services
 Offshore services

Major clients
 Bharat Heavy Electricals
 Bharat Petroleum
 BP
 British Gas
 Geological Survey of India
 Hindustan Petroleum
 Indian Oil Corporation
 Oil & Natural Gas Corporation
 Reliance Industries
 Shell
 Steel Authority of India
 Taj Cruises
 Tata tea

See also

 Borders of India
 Container Corporation of India
 Coastal India
 Exclusive economic zone of India
 Fishing in India

References

Companies based in Mumbai
Container shipping companies
Shipping companies of India
Transport companies established in 1961
Gas shipping companies
Government-owned companies of India
1961 establishments in Maharashtra
Indian companies established in 1961
Companies listed on the National Stock Exchange of India
Companies listed on the Bombay Stock Exchange